This is a list of foreign ministers of the Habsburg monarchy, of the Austrian Empire, and of Austria-Hungary up to 1918.

Ministers of Foreign Affairs of the Habsburg monarchy (1720–1805) 
From 1664/69 the Privy Conference (Geheime Konferenz), a committee of the Imperial Privy Council (Geheimer Rat), provided advice to Emperor Leopold I whereby the Austrian Court Chancellor, responsible for the Habsburg 'Hereditary Lands', served as rapporteur and thereby gained increasing influence. The Habsburg diplomatic service was re-organised, when Emperor Charles VI by resolution of 1720 declared Court Chancellor Philipp Ludwig Wenzel von Sinzendorf responsible for foreign policy issues. Upon Sinzendorf's death in February 1742, Archduchess Maria Theresa finally separated the central Habsburg State Chancellery responsible of Foreign Affairs from the domestic Austrian Court Chancellery.

Ministers of Foreign Affairs of the Austrian Empire (1805–1867)

Ministers of the Imperial and Royal House and of Foreign Affairs of Austria-Hungary (1867–1918)

See also 
 Foreign Ministry of Austria-Hungary
 Austro-Hungarian Foreign Service
 List of diplomatic missions of Austria-Hungary

Notes 
Regarding personal names:
 Prinz  is a title, translated as Prince, not a first or middle name. The female form is Prinzessin. 
 Fürst  is a title, translated as (Sovereign) Prince,  not a first or middle name. The female form is Fürstin. 
 Graf is a title, translated as Count, not a first or middle name. The female form is Gräfin. 
 Freiherr  is a title, translated as Baron, not a first or middle name. The female forms are Freifrau  and Freiin.

Bibliography 
 Erwin Matsch, Der Auswärtige Dienst von Österreich-Ungarn 1720-1920, Vienna, Böhlau, 1986.
 —, Geschichte des Auswärtigen Dienstes von Österreich-Ungarn 1720-1920, Vienna, Böhlau, 1980.

Austria-Hungary, Foreign ministers
History of Austria-Hungary
Foreign relations of Austria-Hungary
People of the Habsburg monarchy
Austria-Hungary-related lists